Bletiinae is a small-sized subtribe of orchids in the tribe Epidendreae of the subfamily Epidendroideae.

The tribe was initially categorized by John Lindley in 1840. Bletiinae has been recognized as a subtribe to Arethuseae.  However, most of its genera were removed in 2005, and the subtribe moved to Epidendreae.

References

 
Orchid subtribes